The 1904 Ascot was an English automobile manufactured for one year only; its 3½hp engine was equipped with a "patented method for mechanically controlling valves, doing away with useless pinions and calves."

It had no connection with the 1914 Ascot or the 1928 Ascot  car maker.

See also
 List of car manufacturers of the United Kingdom

Veteran vehicles
Defunct motor vehicle manufacturers of the United Kingdom